The Netherlands participated at the 2018 Summer Youth Olympics in Buenos Aires, Argentina from 6 October to 18 October 2018.

Archery

Netherlands qualified one archer based on its performance at the 2017 World Archery Youth Championships.

Individual

Team

Athletics

Badminton

The Netherlands qualified one player based on the Badminton Junior World Rankings.

Singles

Team

Basketball

The Netherlands qualified a girls' team based on the U18 3x3 National Federation Ranking.

 Girls' tournament - 1 team of 4 athletes

Beach handball

Beach volleyball

The Netherlands qualified a boys' team based on their performance at 2017-18 European Youth Continental Cup Final.

 Boys' tournament - 1 team of 2 athletes

Dancesport

The Netherlands qualified one dancer based on its performance at the 2018 World Youth Breaking Championship.

 B-Girls - Vicky

Diving

Equestrian

The Netherlands qualified a rider based on its performance at the FEI European Junior Jumping Championships.

 Individual Jumping - 1 athlete

Golf

Individual

Team

Judo

Individual

Team

Roller speed skating

The Netherlands qualified two roller skaters based on its performance at the 2018 Roller Speed Skating World Championship.

 Boys' combined speed event - Merijn Scheperkamp
 Girls' combined speed event - Marit van Beijnum

Rowing

The Netherlands qualified one boat based on its performance at the 2018 European Rowing Junior Championships.

 Girls' pairs - 1 boat

Sailing

The Netherlands qualified one boat based on its performance at the Techno 293+ European Qualifier. They qualified another boat based on its performance at the 2018 Nacra 15 World Championships.

 Boys' Techno 293+ - 1 boat
 Mixed Nacra 15 - 1 boat

Swimming

Tennis

Singles

Doubles

Triathlon

The Netherlands qualified one athlete based on its performance at the 2018 European Youth Olympic Games Qualifier.

Individual

Relay

Weightlifting

References

2018 in Dutch sport
Nations at the 2018 Summer Youth Olympics
Netherlands at the Youth Olympics